The Majority Report by the Royal Commission on the Poor Laws was published in 1909. The commission was set up to work out the best way to relieve the poor of economic and societal hardship. It was made up of members of the Charity Organisation Society such as Helen Bosanquet as well as Local Government Boards, Trade Unions and social researchers such as Charles Booth.

This Royal Commission published two reports:  a Majority report and a Minority report.

Findings of the report
The origins of poverty were moral factors
The Poor Law should remain
Boards of Guardians provided too much outdoor relief
Able-bodied poor were not deterred from seeking relief because of mixed workhouses.

Poor Law in Britain and Ireland
1909 in the United Kingdom